JJ Electronic, s.r.o is a Slovak electronic component manufacturer, and one of the world's remaining producers of vacuum tubes. It is based in Čadca, in the Kysuce region of Slovakia.

Most of its products are audio receiving tubes, mainly used for guitar and hi-fi amplifiers. In technical terms, JJ produces triodes, beam tetrodes and power pentodes. Double diode vacuum tubes for full wave AC-to-DC rectifiers are also produced. JJ also produces electrolytic capacitors for higher-voltage purposes, generally for use in audio amplifiers. JJ also manufactures its own line of high-end audio amplifiers and guitar amplifiers.
 
In 2015, the company sales amounted to EUR 8.5 million and net income came to EUR 3.8 million. Most production is exported to the United States.

History 

Before 1989, Tesla was the main Czechoslovak producer of electron tubes. While Tesla vacuum tubes were exported all over the world, and were known for their quality, the company did not survive the change of economic system after 1989 in combination with the downturn in the vacuum tube market. JJ Electronic was founded in 1993 by Jan Jurco, using the old Tesla machinery for the manufacture of vacuum tubes. Eventually, JJ Electronic started to produce its own line of vacuum tubes and electrolytic capacitors, mainly targeted at high-end audiophile and guitar amplifier applications.

Products 

Small signal vacuum tubes
ECC81/12AT7, dual triode
ECC82/12AU7, dual triode
ECC83/12AX7, dual triode
ECC88/6DJ8, dual triode
12BH7, dual triode
5751, low noise dual triode
EF86, sharp cutoff pentode
6SN7, dual triode

Power vacuum tubes
300B, directly heated power triode
2A3, directly heated power triode
EL34, power pentode
EL84, power pentode
6V6, beam tetrode
6L6GC, beam tetrode
5881, beam tetrode
6550, beam tetrode
6CA7, beam tetrode
KT66, beam tetrode
KT77, beam tetrode
KT88, beam tetrode

Rectifiers
GZ34, indirectly heated full wave rectifier
5U4GB, directly heated full wave rectifier
5Y3, directly heated full wave rectifier
EZ81, indirectly heated full wave rectifier (noval base)

References

External links 

 Electronic Complement Supplers 

Guitar amplification tubes
Manufacturing companies of Slovakia
Companies of Slovakia
Companies established in 1993
Slovak brands
Vacuum tubes